Padmini Ramachandran  (12 June 1932 – 24 September 2006) was an Indian actress and trained Bharatanatyam dancer, who acted in over 250 Indian films. She acted in Tamil, Hindi, Malayalam, Telugu and Russian language films. Padmini, with her elder sister Lalitha and her younger sister Ragini, were called the "Travancore sisters".

Early life
Padmini was born and raised in Trivandrum (present-day Thiruvananthapuram), in what was then the princely state of Travancore (now the Indian state of Kerala) to a Malayali-speaking family. She was the second daughter of Sree Thankappan Pillai and Saraswathi Amma.

Career
At the age of 16, Padmini was cast as the dancer in the Hindi film Kalpana (1948), launching her career. She acted in films consecutively for nearly 30 years in the first lease of her career. Padmini starred with several of the most well-known actors in Indian film, including Sivaji Ganesan, M. G. Ramachandran, N. T. Rama Rao, Raj Kapoor, Shammi Kapoor, Sathyan, Prem Nazir, Rajkumar, Gemini Ganesan and S. S. Rajendran. Ezhai Padum Padu, released in 1950, was her first film in Tamil. V A Gopalakrishnan taught Padmini sisters Tamil since their mother-tongue was Malayalam. He was associated with Pakshi Raja studios. Padmini Ramachandran's association with Sivaji Ganesan started with the film Panam in 1952. Some of her notable Tamil films include Sampoorna Ramayanam (1958 film) (1958),  Thanga Padhumai, Anbu (1953), Kaattu Roja, Thillana Mohanambal (1968), Vietnam Veedu, Edhir Paradhathu, Sri Valli (1961). Other projects include Mangayar Thilakam and Poove Poochudava (1985), Thaikku Oru Thalattu (1986), Lakshmi Vandhachu (1986) and Aayiram Kannudayaal (1986). Some of her Malayalam films include Prasanna, Snehaseema, Vivaahitha, Adhyaapika, Kumara Sambhavam (a 1969 Tamil/Malayalam bilingual), Nokkethadhoorathu Kannum Nattu (1984). Whereas Vasthuhara and Dolar marked the latter's last few films in her acting career and in Malayalam too after which, she immediately retired as an actress and hasn't appeared in any movies since.

In two of her Bollywood films— Mera Naam Joker (1970), also Rishi Kapoor's debut film and Jis Desh Mein Ganga Behti Hai (1960), she was paired with Raj Kapoor. She did another film with Raj Kapoor – Aashiq (1962). Her other Bollywood films include Amardeep (1958), Payal (1957), Afsana (1966), Vaasna (1968), Chanda Aur Bijli (1969) and Babubhai Mistry's Mahabharat (1965). Her most famous was Thillana Mohanambal- a Tamil film where she plays a dancer competing against a musician to see, whose skills are better. She also acted in a 1957 Indian-Soviet film Journey Beyond Three Seas (Hindi version: Pardesi) based on the travelogues of Russian traveler Afanasy Nikitin, called A Journey Beyond the Three Seas.

Personal life
In 1961, Padmini married Ramachandran, a U.S.-based physician. She immediately retired from films, joined her husband in the United States, and focused on family life. The couple had one son, born in 1963, who now lives in Hillsdale, New Jersey and works for Warner Brothers. Sixteen years after her wedding, in 1977, Padmini opened a classical dance school in New Jersey, named the Padmini School of Fine Arts. Today, her school is considered one of the largest Indian classical dance institutions in America.. Actress Sukumari was the maternal first cousin of Padmini and her sisters (the Travancore sisters). Shobana, the famous dancer, is the niece of Padmini. Malayalam actress Ambika Sukumaran is her relative. Actors Vineeth and Krishna are among her relatives. Padmini died of a heart attack at the Chennai Apollo Hospital on 24 September 2006 (aged 76 at the time). She was hospitalized on the previous day when she suffered a fatal heart attack during a meeting with the then Tamil Nadu CM M. Karunanidhi. She was survived by a son, who is settled in the United States. Padmini was well known for her professional rivalry with actress Vyjayanthimala, the successful dancer-actress. They performed a dance number in the Tamil film Vanjikottai Valiban; the well-known song was "Kannum Kannum Kalanthu", which was sung by P. Leela and Jikki. In the song, they were pitted against each other. Due to their professional rivalry, the song has a cult following since the film was released.

Awards 
Won
1954 – Film Fans Association Award for Best Actress
1957 – The "Best Classical Dancer Award" from Moscow Youth Festival
1958 – Kalaimamani Award from the Government of Madras State
1959 – Film Fans Association Award for Best Actress
1960 – Certificate of Merit for Veerapandiya Kattabomman at the Afro-Asian Film Festival
1961 – Film Fans Association Award for Best Actress
1966 – Filmfare Award for Best Supporting Actress for Kaajal
1966 – Film Fans Association Award for Best Actress
 1970 – Tamil Nadu State Film Award for Best Actress for Thillaanaa Mohanambal
 1990 – Filmfare Lifetime Achievement Award – South
 2000 – Tamil Nadu State Film Honorary Award – Kalaivanar Award

 Nominated
 1960 – Filmfare Award for Best Actress for Jis Desh Mein Ganga Behti Hai

Filmography

Endorsements
 Lux
 Filmfare Magazines
 Star & Style
 Remy Talcum Powder

See also
 List of Indian film actresses

References

External links
 
 

1932 births
2006 deaths
Actresses in Tamil cinema
Actresses from Thiruvananthapuram
Filmfare Awards winners
Actresses in Malayalam cinema
Tamil Nadu State Film Awards winners
20th-century Indian actresses
Women of the Kingdom of Travancore
People of the Kingdom of Travancore
Actresses in Telugu cinema
Indian film actresses
Actresses in Malayalam television
Indian television actresses
Actresses in Hindi cinema
21st-century Indian actresses
Actresses in Tamil television
Actresses in Hindi television